Mountcastle may refer to:

Places 
Mountcastle, Edinburgh, a suburb of the Scottish city
Mountcastle, County Tyrone, a townland in County Tyrone, Northern Ireland
Mountcastle, Virginia, an unincorporated community  in New Kent County, Virginia
Mountcastle, Dublin, hamlet which is now incorporated into the Irish capital city

People 
Clara Mountcastle (1837–1908), Canadian author and artist
Robert Edward Lee Mountcastle (1865–1913), American lawyer and politician
Ryan Mountcastle (born 1997), American baseball player
Vernon Benjamin Mountcastle (1918–2015), a retired neuroscientist from the Johns Hopkins University

See also
Duke of Abercorn, the 6th earl was also created Baron Mountcastle and Viscount Strabane, in the Peerage of Ireland